Tercan Dam is an embankment dam on the Tuzla River in Erzincan Province, Turkey. Constructed between 1969 and 1988, the development was backed by the Turkish State Hydraulic Works.

See also

List of dams and reservoirs in Turkey

References
DSI, State Hydraulic Works (Turkey), Retrieved December 16, 2009

Dams in Erzincan Province
Hydroelectric power stations in Turkey
Dams completed in 1988
1988 establishments in Turkey